John Moore Thorpe (April 18, 1890 – June 7, 1956) was an American college football player and coach.  He served as the head football coach at Mount Union College—now known as Mount Union University—in Alliance, Ohio from 1922 to 1931, compiling a record of 55–32–7.  Thorpe graduated from Leetonia High School, in Leetonia, Ohio, in 1910.  He later worked as a safety service director in Alliance.  He died there, on June 7, 1956, after a heart attack.

Head coaching record

College

References

External links
 

1890 births
1956 deaths
Mount Union Purple Raiders athletic directors
Mount Union Purple Raiders football coaches
Mount Union Purple Raiders football players
High school football coaches in Ohio
People from Columbiana County, Ohio
Players of American football from Ohio